Fernando Miguel Arroyo Rosales (6 December 1966 – 30 January 2020) was a Mexican road racing cyclist. He was born in Huamantla, and was a professional from 1989 to 1997.

Major results

1988
1st Vuelta Mexico Telmex
1989
3rd Vuelta Mexico Telmex
1990
2nd Vuelta Mexico Telmex
1991
1st stage 15 Vuelta Mexico Telmex
3rd Grand Prix de Plouay
4th Tour de Suisse
1993
1st stage 2 Redlands Bicycle Classic
1st stage 7 Vuelta Mexico Telmex
1998
1st Vuelta Mexico Telmex
1999
1st Vuelta Ciclista a Costa Rica
2000
 National Road Race Champion
3rd Vuelta Ciclista a Costa Rica
2001
2nd Mexican National Road Race Championship

References

1966 births
2020 deaths
Mexican male cyclists